Normie is a diminutive form of the masculine given name Norman. Notable people and characters with the name include:

People
 Normie Glick (1927–1989), American basketball player
 Norman Himes (1900–1958), Canadian National Hockey League player
 Norman Kwong (1929–2016), Canadian Football League player, businessman and politician
 Normie Rowe (born 1947), Australian pop singer
 Normie Roy (1928–2011), American Major League Baseball pitcher
 Normie Smith (1908–1988), Canadian National Hockey League goaltender

Fictional characters
 Normie Osborn, a Marvel Comics Spider-Man character

See also
 Normality (behavior)
 Normcore

Masculine given names
Hypocorisms